WordGrinder is a word processing application for the unix terminal or Windows console. Wordgrinder focuses on creating a minimalist word processing environment in order to reduce distractions for the end user. The application's author wrote the program for his own use while working on a novel. Files are saved in a text-based file format that includes options and styles with the document (versions prior to v0.7 used a binary file format instead of plain text).

References

Cross-platform free software
Free word processors
Free software programmed in C
Software using the MIT license
2007 software